Barsinella mirabilis is a moth of the subfamily Arctiinae first described by Arthur Gardiner Butler in 1878. It is found in Espírito Santo, Brazil.

References

Lithosiini